Dmitry Alexandrovich Shorin (born April 28, 1971,  Novosibirsk, USSR) is an artist and sculptor.

Biography

Studied at the graphic arts department of the Gorky Pedagogical Institute in Omsk (1987–1988), at the Academy of Public Services in Omsk, specializing in costume design (1988–1990). Then he continued his education at the Academy of Public Services in St. Petersburg in the same area (1990–1992).

In 1993 he joined the Association of Artists “Free Culture” of Art Center “Pushkinskaya, 10”.
Since 1999, his work has been exhibited at auctions at Sotheby's and Phillips de Pury.
In 2008 he became the youngest artist awarded with a solo exhibition at the Marble Palace of the State Russian Museum.

In 2009 he was nominated for the Kandinsky Prize in the category "Project of the Year".
In 2013 his project “I believe in angels” was presented at the 55th Venice Biennale.

Dmitry had over 70 exhibitions in Russia, Europe and America. He participated in 1st and 3rd Moscow Biennale of Contemporary Art, 55th Venice Biennale, HangART-7 in Salzburg, art shows in Kyiv, Madrid, Athens, Vienna, Miami, Paris and London.

His works are on permanent display in State Russian Museum, Moscow Museum of Modern Art, Erarta and presented in numerous museum and personal collections. His paintings were auctioned at major international auction houses such as Sotheby's and Phillips de Pury.
Auction results Sotheby's 2020,    Sotheby's 2021.

In 2013 four sculptures from Dmitry Shorin's project named I Believe in Angels were placed in Terminal 1 of Pulkovo Airport in Saint Petersburg. The glass fiber figures of angels with airplanes' wings decorate the departure hall. His other work created in collaboration with a musician Sergei Shnurov was relocated to Pulkovo in 2014.

Special projects

“I Believe in Angels” 

The project evolved from a proposal to create sculptures for Sheremetyevo Airport. It was supposed to create a monument to Icarus taking off with wings from a real IL-86 on the territory of the terminal. Icarus would represent new power and strength, his non-burning wings would not melt, but would allow him to fly in a cruel atmosphere. As a result, the plot appeared only in the painting “IL-86” in 2010, and the project with the sculptures has changed. The sketch had a barbie with airplane wings attached from plane’s model, where the fuselage was taken in proportion to the body of the barbie.

The perfect body began to point to the angels, and instead of swan wings, they had new, powerful jet engines. Each represents a guardian angel with collective responsibility. A kind of frivolous angels who did not save the passengers of the flight — the wings of each were identical to a certain brand of aircraft with the identification numbers of the board that died in major plane crashes. The project pointed to the human factor in man-made disasters. The angels, being distracted by household chores, did not save the wards entrusted to them.

Then the concept grew into the idea of Belief into The Angels and they turned into guardian angels who have the same wings as airplanes and can follow up a person in the sky.

The project visited Erarta exhibitions in 2013 in London, New York, Zurich and at the 55th Venice Biennale at Palazzo Bembo in Venice.

Four sculptures are located in the Pulkovo airport terminal and two are in the Erarta Museum in St. Petersburg.

Airfield 

“Airfield” is a joint exhibition project of Dmitry Shorin and Sergey Shnurov. The ramp on the runway is a symbol of constant movement, working 24/7 so that people can leave the house, or find it. Airfield is a work about the love of travel, sadness in parting and nostalgia for the old Pulkovo, where the artists spent time before their often flights.

“In the gallery, we imitate a runway with markings. In the painting “Airfield”, the building of Pulkovo Airport, two liners, people go down the ladders. We want to show the real gates of the modern metropolis” – Dmitry Shorin.

 

Now the diptych hangs in the Pulkovo airport terminal.

Apology of Delusions 

A special project was painted picture after picture for exhibition in museums from 2015 to 2018, with non-typical plots and large sizes.

Apology includes 17 paintings from two series “Flowers” (Stargazer, Yak and Poppy, Peony, Lotus, Rose, I am waiting for you at 8 on Mayakovskaya) and “Forest” (Lumen, Scarlet, Pushkin, Pic Nic, Winter, Tanya, Birch Juice, Lambs, Morning in the Forest, April, Apologia of Delusions).

“I wanted to have a dialogue with myself about wandering in the inner aesthetic and psychological territory. Where I find flashes of objects that have not been explored until today. I appealed to a person, and now to a semi-abstract medium and created a non-existent world of illusions, deja vu, mixed with dreams and reality” – Dmitry Shorin. 

Paintings visited exhibitions:
2018 — “Apology of Delusions”, Fine Art Gallery. Moscow, Russia.
2018 — “Scarlet”, A. Kasteyev State Museum of Arts. Alma-Ata, Kazakhstan.
2019 — “Swan and Odette” (with Eva Shorina), New Museum. Saint-Petersburg, Russia.
2020 –- “Today is the past of Tomorrow”, State Museum of Fine Arts of the Republic of Tatarstan, Kazan, 2020.

NFT  

Dmitry started issuing NFTs in 2021. The first series is animated paintings. It includes the works “Banzai”, “Nefertiti”, and “Two Skies”. The first drop on the Foundation platform was included in the NFT sales rating of Russian Artists according to TANR.

The second Over series deals with the digital nature of sculptures and their presence in the metaverse.

“The digital world is a place of reflections and projections, with emotions and receptors twisted to the maximum. NFT is an ephemeral unit. It is pure, unrestricted implementation of the concept, written in digital language.
In this series, each work has its own separate concept and reference — real-life sculptures. But their incarnations and reflections are a touch of digitality and a trace from their elevation into a new medium of the meta-universe” – Dmitry Shorin.

Series “Heads” 

The project with objects on the head includes the paintings “Ilyushin”, ”Star”, “On/Off”, “7 o'clock”, “Nefertiti” 2014 and “Nefertiti” 2021, as well as sculptures “Yuna” and “Tima”. A series with children's heads and technological structures is an allegory about analog thinking It tell us about children who began to re-penetrate the physics of things and the essence of things in their analog structure. On their heads are cylinders of a star-shaped aircraft engine, and their minds are directed deep into phenomena, despite global computerization. At the moment, the sculptures "Yuna" and "Tima" are located at the Riga airport.

Series “Beach” 

The “Beach” series includes the films “Tomorrow is the Last Day”, “May Be”, “Flight from Moscow”, “Departure before 12”, “La Plage” and “Courchevel”.

“The artist does not know the feeling of wanting to go on vacation, because he is always working. The constant thirst for rest, on the one hand, is understandable, but on the other hand, it surprises me that people try to relax even after a vacation. The creation of this time gradation “from vacation to vacation”, the cyclical nature of life and the expectation of a new cycle when the previous one has not ended are the main themes of this series” – Dmitry Shorin.

Chronology of exhibitions

Museum exhibitions  

2021 — “The Next Day” / “A Következő Napon”, CCA im. S. Kuryokhin (Saint-Petersburg, Russia), Miskolci Galéria (Miskolc, Hungary)
Afisha,
ArtMoscow,
Yarcenter,
ArtTube.
Gallerix,
Myseldon,
Nevnov,
Artvesti,
Design-mate,
Above Art,
Colta,
Bezformata,
Sobaka.
2020 — “Today is the past Tomorrow”, State Museum of Fine Arts of the Republic of Tatarstan, Russia
Museum,
Realnoevremya,
Forsmi,
Tatar-inform,
Ramler,
ArtTube.
2019 — “Swan and Odette” (with Eva Shorina), New Museum. Saint-Petersburg, Russia
New Museum,
ArtTube.
2019 — “Plastic Mass”, Marble Palace. Saint-Petersburg, Russia
Russian Museum,
Museum news,
Admagazine, Kulturomania,
Spbvedomosti,
Sobaka,
Peterburg Center.
2018 — “Apology of Delusions”, Moscow Museum of Modern Art, Fine Art Gallery. Moscow, Russia
MMoMA, Gallery Fine Art,
Iz, Independent,
RenTv,
M24,
Museum news, ArtTube.
2018 — “Scarlet”, A. Kasteyev State Museum of Arts. Alma-Ata, Kazakhstan
Museum news,
Rusevr.asia,
City Style Life,
Evrazia-Ural,
Sxodim.
2015 — “Analogue of the Deity”, Erarta. Saint-Petersburg, Russia
Erarta,
Kudago.
2014 — “Ready to fly?”, Moscow Museum of Modern Art. Moscow, Russia
2013 —“I believe in Angels”, Erarta Gallery. London, UK
2013 — “I believe in Angels”, Erarta Gallery. New York, USA
2013 — “I believe in Angels’, Erarta Gallery. Zurich, Switzerland
2013 — “Born to fly and… to crawl”, Benois Wing of the State Russian Museum. Saint-Petersburg, Russia
2012 — “We are (not) alone”, Erarta. Saint Petersburg, Russia
2012 — Tsaritsyno Museum-Reserve. Moscow, Russia
2011 — “Holidays”, Moscow Museum of Modern Art. Moscow, Russia
2011 — “Windows and doors”, State Russian Museum. Saint-Petersburg, Russia
2009 — “Self-portrait”, Moscow Museum of Modern Art. Moscow, Russia
2008 — Selection Art Moscow 2008. Modern Perspectives, Muravyov-Apostol Estate. Moscow, Russia
2001 — Museum of Nonconformism, Art Center Pushkinskaya 10. Saint-Petersburg, Russia

Biennale 

2019 — Florence Biennale, dedicated to the 500th anniversary of the death of Leonardo da Vinci. Florence, Italy
2013 — 55th Venice Biennale, Palazzo Bembo. Venice, Italy
2009 — “Desktop: War and Peace”. Exhibition within the parallel program of the III Moscow Biennale of Contemporary Art, Fine Art Gallery. Moscow, Russia
2005 —“Girls' Best Friends”, Exhibition within the framework of the parallel program of the 1st Moscow Biennale of Contemporary Art, Fine Art Gallery. Moscow, Russia
2004 — ArtKlyazma, Moscow region, Russia
2003 — ArtKlyazma, Moscow region, Russia
1996 — Exhibition in defense of the Art Center Pushkinskaya 10 as part of the IV Biennale of St. Petersburg, Anna Akhmatova Literary and Memorial Museum, Fountain House (Saint Petersburg). Saint-Petersburg, Russia

Personal exhibitions 

2020 — “Air”, Space U. Moscow, Russia 
Artist's website
2020 — “Today is the past Tomorrow”, State Museum of Fine Arts of the Republic of Tatarstan. Kazan, Russia
Exhibition,
Museum,
Realnoevremya,
Forsmi, Afisha,
Tatar-inform,
Rambler,
ArtTube.
2019 — “Swan and Odette” (with Eva Shorina), New Museum. Saint-Petersburg, Russia
New Museum,
ArtTube.
2019 — “Forest Stories”, Ural Vision Gallery. Yekaterinburg, Russia
Ural Vision Gallery,
ArtTube,
Globalcity,
Afisha.
2018 — “Scarlet”, A. Kasteyev State Museum of Arts. Alma-Ata, Kazakhstan
Museum news,
Arhiv,
Rusevr.asia,City Style Life,
Evrazia-Ural,
Sxodim.
2018 — “Under the Eternal Sky”, Ural Vision Gallery. Budapest, Hungary
Ural Vision Gallery
2018 — “Apology of Delusions”, Fine Art Gallery. Moscow, Russia
Winzavod,
ArtGuide.
2015 — “2 I’s”, Fine Art Gallery. Moscow, Russia
Gallery Fine Art
2015 — “Analogue of the Deity”, Erarta. Saint-Petersburg, Russia
Erarta,
KudaGo.
2014 — “Over” (with Vladimir Korolyuk), Savina Gallery. St. Petersburg, Russia
2014 — “Swan fidelity”, Fine Art Gallery. Moscow, Russia
2013 — “Personal Space”, Fine Art Gallery. Moscow, Russia
2013 — “I believe in Angels”, Erarta Gallery. London, UK
2013 — “I believe in Angels”, Erarta Gallery. New York, USA
2013 — “I believe in Angels”, Erarta Gallery. Zurich, Switzerland
2012 — “We are (not) alone”, Erarta. Saint Petersburg, Russia
2011 — “Flowers and Planes”, Fine Art Gallery. Moscow, Russia
2011 — Zurab Tsereteli’s Art Gallery. Moscow, Russia
2011 — “Holidays”, Moscow Museum of Modern Art. Moscow, Russia
2010 — “Joys of Life”, Fine Art Gallery. Moscow 
2010 — “Airfield” (with Sergei Shnurov), AL Gallery. Saint-Petersburg, Russia
2009 — “La rose des vents”, Galerie Stanislas Bourgain. Paris, France[34]
2009 — “Bird’s Market” (with Dmitry Provotorov), AL Gallery. Saint-Petersburg, Russia
2009 — “Desktop: War and Peace”. Exhibition within the parallel program of the III Moscow Biennale of Contemporary Art, Fine Art Gallery. Moscow, Russia
2008 — “Dmitry Shorin in the Russian Museum”, Marble Palace of the State Russian Museum. St. Petersburg, Russia
2008 — “Wind”, Fine Art Gallery. Moscow, Russia
2007 — “Games that people play” (with Dmitry Provotorov), RuArts Gallery. Moscow, Russia
2007 — “Body Parts”, Fine Art Gallery. Moscow, Russia
2006 — “Once Not Forever”, Fine Art Gallery. Moscow, Russia
2005 — “Aeroclub”, Fine Art Gallery. Moscow, Russia
2005 — “Mannequins” (with Dmitry Provotorov), Fine Art Gallery. Moscow, Russia
2005 — “Girls' Best Friends”, Exhibition within the parallel program of the 1st Moscow Biennale of Contemporary Art, Fine Art Gallery. Moscow, Russia
2004 — “Appetite”, Fine Art Gallery. Moscow, Russia
2004 -— “Exhibition of one portrait”, Roman Abramovich, Fine Art Gallery. Moscow, Russia 
2003 — “Girls from Next Door”, Fine Art Gallery. Moscow, Russia
2003 — Borey Gallery. Saint Petersburg, Russia
2003 — Cultural center “Dom”. Moscow, Russia
2003 — “Birds”, Fine Art Gallery. Moscow, Russia
2001 — “Disasters”, Museum of Nonconformism, Art Center Pushkinskaya 10. Saint-Petersburg, Russia
2000 — Borey Gallery. Saint-Petersburg, Russia
1998 — “46 cm3 of blue”, Borey Art Creative Center. Saint-Petersburg, Russia
1996 — Gallery 21, Art Center Pushkinskaya 10. Moscow, Russia

Group exhibitions 

2021 — “The Next Day” / “A Következő Napon”, CCA im. S. Kuryokhin. Saint-Petersburg, Russia
Afisha,
ArtMoscow,
Yarcenter,
ArtTube.
Gallerix,
Myseldon,
Nevnov,
Artvesti,
Design-mate,
Above Art,
Colta,
Bezformata,
Sobaka.
2021 — “The Next Day” / “A Következő Napon”, Miskolci Galéria. Miskolc, Hungary 
2021 — “Resorts”, Vera Pogodina Gallery. Moscow, Russia
Pogodina Gallery
2021 — “Open letter. In memory of Irina Filatova”, Fine Art Gallery. Moscow, Russia
Gallery Fine Art,
Afisha,
ArtTube,
Cabinerdelart.
2021 — “Space is ours!”. Gallery ARTSTORY. Moscow, Russia
Art Story, Afisha,
Museum news, The Village,
The City, Osd.
2021 — “Death of the Lilac”, Fine Art Gallery. Moscow, Russia
Gallery Fine Art,
Winzavod,
Museum news, Afisha,
Interior,
Vashdosug, Cultradio,
Yandex Zen.
2020 — Pasca Art Projects “The Line”, Pasca Municipal Art Center. Hungary.
2020 — Project “2020 - 2070”, RUSNANO Group and Frida Project Foundation, NUST MISIS. Moscow, Russia
Nanoart,
Fiop,
A-a-ah!.
2019 — "Andy Warhol and Russian Art", Artsolus Foundation, Sevkabel. Saint-Petersburg, Russia
Forbes,
The Art Newspaper,
Daily Afisha,
Colta,KudaGo,
Interior,
Paperpaper, Afisha, 
Republic, Fontanka, Meduza, GQ, MK, Sobaka.
2019 — Florence Biennale, dedicated to the 500th anniversary of the death of Leonardo da Vinci. Florence, Italy
Florence Biennale
2019 — “Not Shakespeare. A dream in a summer night”, Fine Art Gallery. Moscow, Russia
Gallery Fine Art,
Eksperiment, 
Afisha,
Above Art.
2019 — “Plastic Mass”, Russian Museum, Marble Palace. Saint-Petersburg, Russia
Russian Museum,
Museum news,
Admagazine,
Kulturomania,
Spbvedomosti,
Sobaka,
Peterburg Center.
2018 — “Apology of Delusions”, Moscow Museum of Modern Art, Fine Art Gallery. Moscow, Russia
MMoMA,
Gallery Fine Art,
Iz,
Independent,
RenTv,
M24, Museum news,
ArtTube.
2017 — “The Extraordinary Adventures of Karik and Vali”, New Museum. Saint-Petersburg, Russia
New Museum,
ArtGuide.
2017 — “Fine Art Gallery — 25 years in art”, Fine Art Gallery. Moscow, Russia
Gallery Fine Art
2016 — “Waiting…”, Fine Art Gallery. Moscow, Russia
Gallerix, Gallery Fine Art.
2014 — “Ready to fly?”, Moscow Museum of Modern Art. Moscow, Russia
2014 — Erarta Gallery. London, UK
2013 — Forum of Public and Street Art graFFFest, Bolshaya Konyushennaya street, 10. St. Petersburg, Russia
2013 — 55th Venice Biennale, Palazzo Bembo. Venice, Italy
2013 — “Born to fly and… to crawl”, Benois Wing of the State Russian Museum. Saint-Petersburg, Russia
2012 — Tsaritsyno Museum-Reserve. Moscow, Russia
2012 — “20 years of the Fine Art Gallery”, Exhibition Halls of the Russian Academy of Arts. Moscow, Russia
2011 — “Windows and doors”, State Russian Museum. Saint-Petersburg, Russia
2010 — “Artistes russes Un art au superlatif”, San Andreas Abbey Center for Contemporary Art. Memak, France
2010 — “Resume 2009-2010”, AL Gallery. Saint-Petersburg, Russia
2009 — “Self-portrait”, Moscow Museum of Modern Art. Moscow, Russia
2009 — Exhibition of nominees for the Kandinsky Prize. Moscow, Russia
2008 — Selection Art Moscow 2008. Modern Perspectives, Muravyov-Apostol Estate. Moscow, Russia
2008 — Festival “Art-Perm”. Perm, Russia
2007 — Gallery of Contemporary Art MART. Saint Petersburg, Russia
2006 — “HangART-7”, Salzburg, Austria
2006 — “Summer Holidays — Hot Summer”, Fine Art Gallery. Moscow, Russia
2004 — ArtKlyazma. Moscow region, Russia 
2004 — “Super Woman”, Fine Art Gallery. Moscow, Russia
2003 — ArtKlyazma. Moscow region, Russia 
2002 — Center for Contemporary Art. Kyiv, Ukraine
2000 — Borey Gallery. Saint-Petersburg, Russia
1998 — Borey Gallery. Saint-Petersburg, Russia
1997 — “History of Advertising”, Big Exhibition Hall of the Union of Artists of Russia. Saint-Petersburg, Russia
1996 — Exhibition in defense of the Art Center Pushkinskaya 10 (as part of the IV Biennale of St. Petersburg), Anna Akhmatova Literary and Memorial Museum, Fountain House (Saint Petersburg). Saint-Petersburg, Russia
1995 — Exhibition of private collections, Saint Petersburg Manege. Saint-Petersburg, Russia
1995 — Art Center Pushkinskaya 10. Saint-Petersburg, Russia
1994 — International Festival of Performance, Saint Petersburg Manege. Saint-Petersburg, Russia
1994 — “Best Pictures”, Gallery 103, Gallery 21, Art Center Pushkinskaya 10. Saint-Petersburg, Russia

Links
Artist's website

Books
“Apology of delusions”, catalog of the exhibition “Apology of delusions” in Moscow Museum of Modern Art, together with Fine Art Gallery, 2018, Moscow, Russia
Exhibitions
“Today is the past of Tomorrow” exhibition catalog “Today is the past of Tomorrow”, Museum of Fine Arts of Tatarstan, 2020, Kazan, Russia MMoMA
“Dmitry Shorin”, catalog of the exhibition “Dmitry Shorin in the Russian Museum”, 2010, State Russian Museum, St. Petersburg, Russia

Gallery

Notes

1971 births
Living people
20th-century Russian painters
Russian male painters
21st-century Russian painters
Artists from Saint Petersburg
21st-century Russian sculptors
20th-century Russian sculptors
20th-century Russian male artists
Russian male sculptors
21st-century Russian male artists